California, Ohio may refer to:

 California, Cincinnati, a neighborhood within Cincinnati, Ohio
 Big Plain, Ohio, originally named California